The Miss Preakness Stakes is a Grade III American Thoroughbred horse race for three-year-old fillies over a distance of six furlongs on the dirt held annually run on Black-Eyed Susan Stakes Day at the Pimlico Race Course in Baltimore, Maryland as a stakes feature of the undercard. The event offers a purse of $150,000 added.

History

The race was first carded in its inaugural running in 1986. It became graded for the first time in 2002 by the American Graded Stakes Committee. The race was simply called the Miss Preakness Stakes from 1986 through 2003. The race was renamed with sponsorship in 2004 to the "Adena Stallions Miss Preakness Stakes".

Sponsorship

From 2015 to 2019 the event was sponsored by Adena Springs, a breeding operation owned by Magna Entertainment Corporation Chairman, Frank Stronach. Adena Stallions' are the breeding stock stallions at Adena Springs including: Ghostzapper, Macho Uno, Giacomo, Congaree, Awesome Again and Touch Gold in Midway, Kentucky. Adena Springs stallions standing in Ocala, Florida includes Red Bullet, Milwaukee Brew, and Alphabet Soup.  Adena Springs has donated a 2017 no guarantee breeding season to point of entry for the winning entry.

Records 

Speed record:  
 1:07.70 – Covfefe (2019)

Margins: 
 lengths – Covfefe (2019)

Most wins by a jockey:
 4 – Chris McCarron     (1986, 1987, 1988 & 1990)

Most wins by a trainer:
 3 – D. Wayne Lukas    (1995, 1998, & 2007)
 3 – Todd Pletcher   (2000, 2011, 2016)

Most wins by an owner:
 no owner has won this race more than once.

Winners of The Miss Preakness Stakes

See also 
 List of American and Canadian Graded races
 Miss Preakness Stakes "top three finishers" and starters
 Preakness Stakes
 Black-Eyed Susan Stakes 
 Pimlico Race Course
 List of graded stakes at Pimlico Race Course

References 

 The Gallorette Handicap at Pedigree Query

Graded stakes races in the United States
1986 establishments in Maryland
Pimlico Race Course
Horse races in Maryland
Recurring sporting events established in 1986
Grade 3 stakes races in the United States